Albero Alto is a municipality in the province of Huesca, Spain. As of 2010, it has a population of 132 inhabitants.

References

External links 

Municipalities in the Province of Huesca